Bleak Moments is a 1971 British comedy-drama film by Mike Leigh in his directorial debut. Leigh's screenplay is based on a 1970 stage play at the Open Space Theatre, about the dysfunctional life of a young secretary.

Leigh and Leslie Blair had formed their own production company, Autumn Productions, and Leigh wanted to adapt Moments. He was able to realise that desire when Albert Finney and Michael Medwin's Memorial Films, which had recently made If.... and was about to produce Gumshoe, "delivered the main financial backing, as well as unused spare bits of film rolls."

Plot
Sylvia leads a quiet life caring for her sister Hilda who has complex care needs. Their lonely suburban existence is accentuated by a social awkwardness that detaches them from the community and fuels a life of seclusion and despair.

Cast
 Anne Raitt as Sylvia
 Sarah Stephenson as Hilda, Sylvia's sister
 Eric Allan as Peter
 Joolia Cappleman as Pat
 Mike Bradwell as Norman
 Donald Sumpter as Norman's friend
 Liz Smith as Pat's mother

Reception
The critic Michael Coveney (writing in 1996) wrote that "Even though the sound quality is poor and the pace a little on the leisurely side - there is tonal assurance and technical finesse in the presentation of the marvellous performances that proclaims both originality and talent. Sylvia is heard playing Chopin's E-flat Nocturne over the opening credits. The general inability to express inner feelings reinforces a mood of bleak, Slavic despair..[there is a] Chekhovian atmosphere, unrelieved by the sort of cathartic climax that characterises most of Leigh's subsequent work." And Coveney praised Leigh's "poetic sensitivity to what G.K.Chesterton called 'the significance of the unexamined life.' Even the exterior shots have a plaintive, insistent quality, with beautifully composed views of pebbledash houses and garages, of clear roads and tall trees, around West Norwood and Tulse Hill."

John Coleman in New Statesman  called it, "the most remarkable début by a British director, working on an absurdly low budget and with unknown actors, that I have ever seen."

Roger Ebert in the Chicago Sun Times said "Bleak Moments is a masterpiece, plain and simple... its greatness is not just in the direction or subject, but in the complete singularity of the performances."

Tony Garnett, the innovative and radical producer, admired the stage performance and was impressed with the subsequent film. He 'spotted Leigh's potential immediately' and his support would prove invaluable. Garnett was providing several films a year for the BBC, and would also produce Leigh's next project, Hard Labour, for BBC Television in 1973.

Home video
Bleak Moments has been released in 4:3 aspect ratio several times in the UK: VHS (BFI/Connoisseur Video, 2000), DVD (Soda Pictures, 2008, 2015), and as part of The Mike Leigh Film Collection box set (Spirit Entertainment Ltd, 2008).

It has also seen US release by Water Bearer Films, Inc. on VHS (1998), DVD (2004), and in their Mike Leigh Collection, Vol. 2 box set (2004).

A remastered Blu-ray of the film was released by the BFI in November 2021.

References

External links
 
 
 Bleak Moments at BFI Screenonline
 1972 review by Roger Ebert

1971 films
British comedy-drama films
British films based on plays
Films directed by Mike Leigh
Golden Leopard winners
1971 directorial debut films
1970s English-language films
1970s British films